Dutchtown Southern Railroad, L.L.C. is a standard gauge switching railroad in Geismar, Louisiana controlled by Watco Holdings, Inc. that operates a 1.76-mile line leased from Illinois Central Railroad Company, part of Canadian National Railway (CN). It interchanges at Geismar with CN.

See also

References

External links

Switching and terminal railroads
Louisiana railroads
Watco